Philippe Max Fauchet is a Belgian-born engineer and academic. He has served as Bruce and Bridgitt Evans Dean of the Vanderbilt University School of Engineering since July 2012.

Fauchet received an undergraduate degree from the Faculté polytechnique de Mons in 1978. He completed a Master of Science in engineering at Brown University and a Ph.D. in applied physics at Stanford University in 1984. Fauchet received a Sloan Research Fellowship in 1988.

Between 1990 and 2012, Fauchet taught at the University of Rochester; he served as chair of the university's Department of Electrical and Computer Engineering from 2010 to 2012. Fauchet was named Dean of the Vanderbilt University School of Engineering in December 2011. He assumed the position in July 2012, succeeding Kenneth Galloway. Among Fauchet's stated priorities for the school early in his tenure were developing a culture of entrepreneurship and increasing collaboration. He was reappointed for another five-year term as Dean in 2017.

Honors and awards 

 Fellow, National Academy of Inventors, 2016
 Fellow, American Association for the Advancement of Science, 2016
 Fellow, Materials Research Society, 2011
 Fellow, SPIE, 2010
 Fellow, Institute of Electrical and Electronics Engineers, 1999
 Fellow, American Physical Society, 1998
 Fellow, Optical Society of America, 1998
 Sloan Research Fellow, 1988

References 

Year of birth missing (living people)
American people of Belgian descent
21st-century Belgian engineers
21st-century American engineers
Brown University School of Engineering alumni
Stanford University alumni
Fellows of the National Academy of Inventors
Fellows of the American Association for the Advancement of Science
Fellows of the American Physical Society
Vanderbilt University faculty
Sloan Research Fellows
Living people